Brentus anchorago is a long-snouted weevil, from the family Brentidae. It is found from southern Florida to South America.

Description
Brentus anchorago is 15 to 52 mm in length. The adult is black in color, with longitudinal yellow marking on the elytra. It has serrate, non-geniculate (elbowed) antennae.
The species exhibits significant sexual dimorphism; the males are much thinner than the females.

Distribution and habitat
This widespread neotropical species is known from Mexico, the West Indies and South America. In the U.S. it occurs in Dade and Monroe counties in Florida.

It seems to be associated with the gumbo-limbo tree (Bursera simaruba), throughout its distribution. Larvae bore in dead trees, and the adults can sometimes be found in large numbers under the bark of dead logs.

References

Beetles of Central America
Beetles described in 1758
Taxa named by Carl Linnaeus